TSW may refer to:

Tactical Support Wing, a unit of the United States Navy
Television South West, the ITV franchise holder for the South West England region from 1 January 1982 until 31 December 1992
The Secret World, a 2012 MMORPG from developer Funcom
Tiger Sports Wheels, a custom alloy wheel manufacturer
Tin Shui Wai, a town located in the northwestern part of the New Territories, Hong Kong, in Yuen Long District
Topical steroid withdrawal
Trader's and Scheduler's Workbench, Oil & Gas functionality for SAP ERP
Train Sim World, a 2018 video game from Dovetail Games
Tsuen Wan station, Hong Kong; MTR station code